Niagara Region can refer to:

Buffalo Niagara Region, which includes parts of both the United States and Canada
Buffalo–Niagara Falls metropolitan area, two counties in New York, United States
Regional Municipality of Niagara, a Canadian regional municipality comprising 12 cities, towns and townships.
Niagara Peninsula, a geographic area of Canada